The British Consulate-General, Boston is the United Kingdom's local consulate for New England, including Connecticut, Maine, Massachusetts, New Hampshire, Rhode Island and Vermont.

List of Consuls-General of the United Kingdom to Boston 
 1899–1902: Sir John Blunt 
 1908: William Wyndham
 1908–1919: Frederick Leay
 1919–1920: Sir Harry Armstrong 
 1920–1922: Thomas Porter
 1922–1931: Edward Gray
 1931–1933: George Beak
 1933–1943: Hugh Ford
 1943–1944: Sir Anthony George  (died in office)
 1944–1947: Bernard Sullivan 
 1947–1950: Eric Whitamore
 1950–1954: Leslie Barber 
 1954–1955: Sir William Barker 
 1955–1958: Sir Robert Marett 
 1959–1962: George Edmondson 
 1962–1966: Sir John Curle 
 1966–1969: Ralph Selby 
 1969–1971: Leonore Storar
 1971–1975: Alastair Maitland 
 1975–1977: Granville Ramage 
 1977–1980: Sir Giles Bullard 
 1980–1983: Philip McKearney 
 1983–1987: David A. Burns 
 1988–1991: Philip McLean 
 1992–1995: John Wynne Owen 
 1995–1999: James Poston 
 1999–2003: Hon. George Fergusson
 2003–2007: John Rankin
 2007–2012: Phil Budden
 2012–2016: Susie Kitchens
 2016–2020: Harriet Cross
 2020–present: Peter Abbott

See also 
 List of diplomatic missions in Boston

References

External links 
British Consulate-General in Boston

Consuls-General, Boston
Boston
Diplomatic missions in Boston